This is a list of "Free Corps", various military and/or paramilitary units raised from the civilian population.

Habsburg monarchy
 Freikorps, pre-1754 German units
 Serbian Free Corps (1787–92)
 Patriot militias, called Free Corps, in Austrian Netherlands

Prussia
 Freiwilliges Feldjäger-Korps von Schmidt (1813–14), a volunteer Riflemen Corps that formed in late 1813
 Lützow Free Corps (1813–14), a voluntary force of the Prussian army during the Napoleonic Wars

World War II
 British Free Corps (BFC), in the Waffen-SS World War II
 Sudetendeutsches Freikorps, was a paramilitary fifth-columnist organisation formed by Czech German nationalists with Nazi sympathies
 Free Corps Denmark (1941–43), Danish volunteer free corps created by the Danish Nazi Party (DNSAP)

Other
 Exercitiegenootschap, military organisation in the 18th century Netherlands
 Schutterij, a voluntary city guard or citizen militia in the medieval and early modern Netherlands
 Munckska kåren,  was a Swedish secret paramilitary group

Fictional 
 In Shannara series of novels written by Terry Brooks, the Free Corps is a unit of the Border Legion of Callahorn and was led by Stee Jans; it appeared in The Elfstones of Shannara, helping to defend the Ellcrys against the Demons.

Freikorps
Free Corps
Irregular units and formations
Auxiliary military units